NMC v Persons Unknown is a 2009 English legal case in which a super-injunction was obtained. The case is cited as an example of a super-injunction in Laura Scaife's Handbook of Social Media Law.

References

English privacy case law
2009 in British law